Manfred Starke (born 21 February 1991) is a Namibian professional footballer who plays as an attacking midfielder for  club VfB Oldenburg.

Club career
Starke was born in Windhoek, Namibia to a Namibian-born German father and a Dutch mother. He began his professional career at FC Hansa Rostock. He is the older brother of Sandra Starke.

Starke moved to FSV Zwickau in 2020.

In July 2022, he signed with VfB Oldenburg, newly promoted to the 3. Liga.

International career
In October 2012, Starke made his debut for Namibia in a friendly against Rwanda.
He played at 2019 Africa Cup of Nations, the country's first continental tournament in 11 years.

References

External links
 
 

1991 births
Living people
Namibian people of German descent
Namibian people of Dutch descent
German people of Namibian descent
German people of Dutch descent
Footballers from Windhoek
White Namibian people
German footballers
Association football midfielders
Namibia international footballers
2019 Africa Cup of Nations players
2. Bundesliga players
3. Liga players
Regionalliga players
FC Hansa Rostock players
FC Carl Zeiss Jena players
1. FC Kaiserslautern players
FSV Zwickau players
VfB Oldenburg players
Namibian expatriate footballers
Namibian men's footballers